Henrytown is an unincorporated community in Fillmore County, in the U.S. state of Minnesota.

History
Henrytown was platted in 1854. The community was named for Henry Onstine, an early settler. The Henrytown post office closed in 1902.

https://www.findagrave.com/cgi-bin/fg.cgi?page=gr&GRid=40281792

References

Unincorporated communities in Fillmore County, Minnesota
Unincorporated communities in Minnesota